The western spiny-tailed gecko (Strophurus strophurus) is a species of lizard in the family Diplodactylidae. The species is endemic to Australia.

Geographic range
S. strophurus is found in the Australian state of Western Australia.

Habitat
The natural habitat of S. strophurus is shrubland.

Reproduction
S. strophurus is oviparous.

References

Further reading
Boulenger GA (1885). Catalogue of the Lizards in the British Museum (Natural History). Second Edition. Volume I. Gekkonidæ ... London: Trustees of the British Museum (Natural History). (Taylor and Francis, printers). xii + 436 pp. + Plates I-XXXII. (Diplodactylus strophurus, new combination, p. 100).
Cogger HG (2014). Reptiles and Amphibians of Australia, Seventh Edition. Clayton, Victoria, Australia: CSIRO Publishing. xxx + 1,033 pp. .
Duméril AMC, Bibron G (1836). Erpétologie générale ou Histoire naturelle complète des Reptiles, Tome troisième [= General Herpetology or Complete Natural History of the Reptiles, Volume 3 ]. Paris: Roret. iv + 517 pp. + Errata et emendanda. (Phyllodactylus strophurus, new species, pp. 397–399). (in French).
Rösler H (2000). "Kommentierte Liste der rezent, subrezent und fossil bekannten Geckotaxa (Reptilia: Gekkonomorpha) [= Annotated list of recent, subrecent and fossil known Geckotaxa (Reptilia: Gekkonomorpha)". Gekkota 2: 28–153. (Strophurus strophurus, p. 115). (in German).
Wilson, Steve; Swan, Gerry (2013). A Complete Guide to Reptiles of Australia, Fourth Edition. Sydney: New Holland Publishers. 522 pp. .

Strophurus
Geckos of Australia
Reptiles described in 1836
Taxa named by André Marie Constant Duméril
Taxa named by Gabriel Bibron